Mostafa Madbouly's ministry is the 126th ministry in the history of Egypt. Mostafa Madbouly was commissioned to form the ministry on 7 June 2018, and the ministry was sworn in on 14 June 2018.

Current members

References 

Cabinets established in 2018
2018 establishments in Egypt
Cabinets of Egypt